The Namaqua Pony is an extinct breed of horse from South Africa. It was similar to the Basuto pony and originated from the Cape Horse.

References 

Horse breeds originating in South Africa
Horse breeds